Mbói Tu'i is one of the seven legendary monsters of Guaraní mythology. He is the second son of Tau and Kerana.

Name 
Mbói Tu'i literally translates to "snake-parrot" which describes this creature's appearance.

Myths 
Mbói Tu'i has the form of an enormous serpent with a huge parrot head and a huge beak. He also has a red, forked tongue the color of blood. His skin is scaly and streaked. Feathers cover his head. He has a harmful look that frightens everyone who has the bad luck to be found with him. He patrols the swamps and protects amphibian life.  He enjoys the humidity and flowers. He lets out an incredible powerful and terrible squawk which can be heard from very far off and which instills terror in all who hear it. He is considered the protector of aquatic animals and the wetlands.

See also
Basilisco Chilote
The Legend of Iguassu Falls: The Folklore, Mystery and Beauty C.W. Peters - the legend of how Iguassu was formed by the Serpentine God of the river - Mboi

References

COLMAN, Narciso R. (Rosicrán): Ñande Ypy Kuéra ("Nuestros antepasados"), 1929

Guaraní legendary creatures
Guaraní deities
Sea and river gods
Legendary serpents
Legendary birds
Mythological hybrids